HMS Shark was a second-batch S-class submarine built during the 1930s for the Royal Navy. Completed in 1934, the boat fought in the Second World War. Shark is one of twelve boats named in the song "Twelve Little S-Boats".

Design and description
The second batch of S-class submarines were designed as slightly improved and enlarged versions of the earlier boats of the class and were intended to operate in the North and Baltic Seas. They displaced  on the surface and  submerged. The S-class submarines had a crew of 40 officers and ratings.

For surface running, the boats were powered by two  diesel engines, each driving one propeller shaft. When submerged each propeller was driven by a  electric motor. They could reach  on the surface and  underwater.

The S-class boats were armed with six  torpedo tubes in the bow. They carried six reload torpedoes for a total of a dozen torpedoes. They were also armed with a 3-inch (76 mm) deck gun.

Construction and career
Ordered on 12 June 1933, Shark was laid down on 15 June 1933 at HM Dockyard, Chatham and was launched on 31 May 1934. The boat was completed on 31 December 1934.

The submarine was attacked by German aircraft while surfacing on patrol off the coast of Norway near Skudenes on 5 July 1940. While trying to fight off the aircraft, the submarine succeeded in shooting down a Dornier Do 17. Due to the damage the submarine had suffered and likely further attack from the enemy aircraft overhead it was decided to surrender the submarine. The next day at about 04:00 the German minesweeping trawlers M-1803, M-1806 and M-1807 arrived at the scene and took the crew on board. Shark was taken under tow but the crew had scuttled her prior to leaving. Amidst much cheering from the captured British sailors, the German trawler crews were forced to cut the hawsers before Shark sank and took the towing vessels with her.

Crew
The boat's captain, Lieutenant Commander Peter Buckley, was involved in planning a number of escape attempts from his prisoner of war camp. 

ERA W. E. "Wally" Hammond made a number of escape attempts before being held in Oflag IV-C – Colditz. With ERA Don "Tubby" Lister (from the captured submarine ) he made a successful escape by campaigning for a transfer from Colditz, arguing that he was not an officer. He was transferred to Lamsdorf prison, escaped from a Breslau work party, and reached England via Switzerland in 1943.

Citations

References

External links
 IWM Interview with Peter Buckley

 

British S-class submarines (1931)
World War II shipwrecks in the Atlantic Ocean
1934 ships
World War II submarines of the United Kingdom
Submarines sunk by aircraft
Maritime incidents in July 1940
Naval ships of the United Kingdom captured by Germany during World War II
Ships sunk by German aircraft
Scuttled vessels of the United Kingdom